"Total Eclipse" / "Die schwarze Witwe" is a double A-side single released in 2001 by German pop duo Rosenstolz, featuring guest singers Marc Almond (on "Total Eclipse") and Nina Hagen (on "Die schwarze Witwe"). The single reached No. 22 in the German singles chart.

Background
Rosenstolz's collaboration with Almond came about after the English singer received one of the pop duo's CDs from a journalist and then contacted the duo a few days later. The song they chose to work on together, "Total Eclipse", was written by American musician Kristian Hoffman and originally recorded by German singer Klaus Nomi, appearing on Nomi's 1981 debut album. Both AnNa R. and Peter Plate of Rosenstolz were fans of Nomi. Almond also met Nomi in New York many years earlier.

For Rosenstolz's collaboration with Hagen, the duo themselves contacted the German singer. They felt that the song they had written, "Die schwarze Witwe" (The black widow), was tailor-made for her.

"Total Eclipse" and "Die schwarze Witwe" also appear on Rosenstolz's 2000 album Kassengift. However, the album's versions of the songs do not feature Almond and Hagen on vocals.

Track listing

CD 1 

Rosenstolz and Marc Almond are featured on the single cover.
 "Total Eclipse" (Radio Version - Rosenstolz + Marc Almond) – 3:29
 "Die schwarze Witwe" (Tarantula Radio Mix - Rosenstolz + Nina Hagen) – 4:22
 "Du atmest nicht" (Rosenstolz + 2raumwohnung) – 3:50
 "Enfants des nuits" – 5:23

CD 2 

Rosenstolz and Nina Hagen are featured on the single cover.
 "Total Eclipse" (Long Version - Rosenstolz + Marc Almond) – 3:59
 "Die schwarze Witwe" (Rosenstolz + Nina Hagen) – 3:53
 "Kassengift" (Drag Mix) – 4:44
 "Les Larmes de Septembre" – 4:43

References

External links
"Total Eclipse" music video (Adobe Flash) under official Rosenstolz profile on MyVideo (streamed copy where licensed) 

"Total Eclipse" lyrics at official Kristian Hoffman website

2001 singles
German songs
Nina Hagen songs
Marc Almond songs
Song articles with missing songwriters
2001 songs